Yoon Hee-joon (born January 1985), also spelled Yoon Hee-jeun or Yun Hyi-jun, is a South Korean former long track speed skater, who was active between 1997 and 2002.

Yoon represented her nation at international competitions. As a junior she participated at three World Junior Speed Skating Championships. At elite level she competed at the 2001 Asian Speed Skating Championships and the 2003 Asian Winter Games. Between 2001 and 2003 she had a total of three starts at national championships. She never became national champion, but won the silver medal at the 2001 and 2002 South Korean Allround Championships and two bronze medals at the 2003 South Korean Single Distance Championships.

Records

Personal records

References

1985 births
Place of birth missing (living people)
Date of birth missing (living people)
South Korean female speed skaters
Living people
Speed skaters at the 2003 Asian Winter Games
21st-century South Korean women